Maloyan is a surname. Notable people with the surname include:

Artur Maloyan (born 1989), Russian footballer
Ignatius Maloyan (1869–1915), Armenian Eastern Catholic archbishop